Henry Hemphill (1830–1914) was an American malacologist, a biologist who studies mollusks. In particular he studied land and freshwater mollusca.

His collection of land, freshwater, and marine mollusks became holdings of the California Academy of Sciences and Stanford University.

He was born in Delaware in 1830. He worked as a bricklayer in San Diego 1865, after making gold prospecting trips in the western states. He collected mollusks as early as 1861. He published catalogues of shells for sale from the 1870s to 1890. He moved to Oakland around 1909. He died in 1914 on July 24 as a result of contact with arsenic.

He sold and sent out material labeled with unpublished names, and introduced varieties and formal names. He often used vague terms to describe the locality of specimens.

Taxa

He named and described many molluscan taxa, including:
 Fluminicola columbiana Hemphill in Pilsbry, 1899 - a freshwater snail
 Helminthoglypta walkeriana (Hemphill, 1911)

A number of taxa were named after Hemphill, including:

 Hemphillia Bland & Binney, 1872, a land slug genus

References

 
 Dall W. H. (1914). "Henry Hemphill". Science (n.s.) 40(1025): 265–266.
 Dall W. H. (1914). "Henry Hemphill". The Nautilus 28(5): 58–59.
 Clench (1944). "Hemphill’s Catalogue of the land and freshwater shells of Utah". The Nautilus 57(3): 108.
 Pilsbry H. A. (1944). "Hemphill’s “Catalogue of the land and freshwater shells of Utah”". The Nautilus 57(4): 144.

External links
 

American malacologists
1830 births
1914 deaths
People from Wilmington, Delaware
Conchologists